Georgios Kantimiris (born 19 September 1982) is a Greek former professional footballer who played as a goalkeeper.

Career

In January 2008, Kantimiris  who has played in Ionikos and Rodos, signed a year and 1/2 contract for Niki Volos stated: 

On 26 July 2017 he joined Aris. On 5 July 2018 he renewed his contract for a further season.

Honours

Veria
Football League (Greece): 1
Runner-up: 2011-12

Individual
2013–14 MVP award(s): (1) Matchday 26 
2014–15 MVP award(s): (1) Matchday 13
Football League Goalkeeper of the Year: 2011-12 (Runner-up)
NOVA Superleague Awards 2014: Best team (Goalkeeper)

References

1982 births
Living people
People from Rhodes
Greek footballers
Association football goalkeepers
Super League Greece players
Football League (Greece) players
Niki Volos F.C. players
Ionikos F.C. players
Veria F.C. players
Aris Thessaloniki F.C. players
Sportspeople from the South Aegean
21st-century Greek people